Ryota Nakano is a Japanese film director, most famous for his film "Her Love Boils Bathwater"

Background 
Nakano was born in 1973 and grew up in Kyoto. Nakano's father died when he was 6 and he was brought up by his mother. After leaving university, he was about 23 when he decided to be a filmmaker, and hadn't been a film fan before that time. He then went to he studied at the Japan Film School. As a student Nakano travelled to India to make a student film, which would later be an influence on Her lover boils bathwater. His graduation project was As We Go Cheering Our Flaming Lives.

Upon leaving film school, he started off as an assistant director but lost confidence,  deciding he was no good at it after being fired from his position in the middle of  a shoot. After that,  he dropped out of the industry for a while. Upon returning to directing work, he started off working on minor televisions shows, before deciding to try directing movies in a serious fashion. IN order to do this, he went into heavy debt to finance Capturing Dad, which was made in 2012.  The film won awards and critical praise in Japan, which encouraged him to stick with the industry.

His next film was  Her lover boils bathwater which won critical acclaim both in Japan and abroad. Since that time, his films have regularly been chosen for multiple film festivals around the world, and he has had his films nominated and has won various awards.

His films often centre around death, or impending death, and its effect on people. In particular, they may focus on the family unit and challenges to it.

Awards 
He received an award at the Tama New Wave Grand Prix and the Japan Film School's Imamura Award, early in his career. IN 2009 he won the Kimura Ilhei Award He won 
the Best Director Award at the SKIP City International D-Cinema Festival in 2012. Upon release, Her Love Boils Bathwater, at the Japan Academy Film Prizes, was nominated for six categories including Best Picture of the Year, Director of the Year and best Screenplay.

Films 
As We Go Cheering Our Flaming Lives (2000)
Rocket Punch (2006) (short)
Capturing Dad (2012)
Her Love Boils Bathwater (2016)
A Long Goodbye (2019)
The Asadas (2020)

References

External links
 

Japanese film directors
1973 births
Living people